The 2014 CS U.S. International Figure Skating Classic was a senior international figure skating competition held in September 2014 at the Salt Lake City Sports Complex in Salt Lake City, Utah. It was part of the 2014–15 ISU Challenger Series. Medals were awarded in the disciplines of men's singles, ladies' singles, pair skating, and ice dancing.

The preliminary entries were published on August 15, 2014.

Results

Medal summary

Men
Aaron won the men's title for third year in a row.

Ladies
Polina Edmunds of the United States won her first senior international title. Teammate Courtney Hicks took silver while Japan's Riona Kato obtained the bronze.

Pairs
Scimeca/Knierim won the pairs' title by more than seven points.

Ice dancing
Aldridge/Eaton of the United States won gold ahead of Canada's Orford/Williams and fellow Americans Cannuscio/McManus.

References

External links
 2014 U.S. International Figure Skating Classic at the International Skating Union

U.S. International Figure Skating Classic
U.S. International Figure Skating Classic, 2014
U.S. International Figure Skating Classic
U.S. International Figure Skating Classic
U.S. International Figure Skating Classic
Sports in Salt Lake City